Carlo Falconi (20 October 1915 – 24 September 1998) was an Italian journalist and writer about Roman Catholicism.

Ordained as a Catholic priest in 1938, Falconi left the priesthood in 1949 and became a journalist.

The Kirkus Review said of The Popes in the Twentieth Century, "On the whole, then, the book is a readable and not uninteresting, but primarily subjective, history of the twentieth-century papacy, that will hold little appeal for a critical audience."

Works
 Pope John and his council; a diary of the Second Vatican Council, September–December 1962, 1964
 The silence of Pius XII, 1965
 The Popes in the twentieth century, from Pius X to John XXIII, 1967.

References

Further reading
 G. Martina, 'Carlo Falconi (1915-1998)', Rivista di storia della Chiesa in Italia, Vol. 52 (1998), pp. 591–4

1915 births
1998 deaths
Italian non-fiction writers
Italian male journalists
Italian Roman Catholic writers
Laicized Roman Catholic priests
20th-century Italian journalists
20th-century Italian male writers